Matthew Benjakarn Braly (born November 8, 1988) is an American animator, writer, storyboard artist, director and producer. He is best known as the creator and executive producer of the Disney Channel animated series Amphibia. He also worked as a director on Gravity Falls and some episodes of Big City Greens.

Career
Braly was inspired to pursue a career in animation after a "career day" at high school, where a Pixar animator drew an image of Lumiere from Disney's Beauty and the Beast while talking about working on animation for a living, and started his career studying at the CalArts institute. After graduating, he joined DreamWorks Animation, where he worked as an storyboard artist in the computer-animated film Turbo (2013).

While working on Turbo, Braly and several other DreamWorks Animation storyboard artists went to visit Alex Hirsch, who was working on a show titled Gravity Falls (2012–16) for Disney Television Animation. Hirsch also went to CalArts and, while they never studied together, Braly liked his student films. During the visit, Hirsch pitched Gravity Falls to Braly.

Fascinated by the concept and how Hirsch wanted it to be serialized program, Braly did a test to work on the show, after which he was hired, serving as a storyboard artist and director for the series. Braly credited Hirsch as the one who "taught [him] so much about storytelling, about developing characters and developing a world", as well as the one who inspired him to create his own show. The series premiered on June 15, 2012, and ended on February 15, 2016. In 2016, Braly won an Annie Award for directing the Gravity Falls episode "Northwest Mansion Mystery". Braly also served as an in-house key animator for the closing scene for the episode "Not What He Seems".

After directing on Big City Greens, Braly developed a show titled Amphibia, for Disney. The show centers on the adventures of a Thai-American girl named Anne Boonchuy in the titular frog-populated world. The show is based on Braly's childhood trips to Bangkok, Thailand, where he felt like an outsider but ultimately ended up not wanting to leave. He also drew inspiration from video games such as The Legend of Zelda and Chrono Trigger. Braly, who is Thai-American himself, made the choice of making the lead character Thai-American due to a wish to creating a Thai character, as there were few Thai lead characters in television series when he was a kid. The series aired for three seasons of 58 episodes from June 17, 2019, to May 14, 2022. He considers the series finale "The Hardest Thing" to be his favorite episode.

Personal life
Braly is of Thai descent. His mother, On Braly, provided the voice of Mrs. Boonchuy on Amphibia. He is currently married to software engineer, Kathrine Bedrosian.

As a kid, Braly used to watch films such as Mortal Kombat (1995) due to them being filmed in Thailand, as there was no Thai representation on TV. He also used to draw characters from franchises like Mortal Kombat and Sonic the Hedgehog. Braly is a fan of the Sonic the Hedgehog franchise, and was inspired by the opening sequence in the first episode of the anime Sonic X for the climax of the Amphibia episode "True Colors". Similarly, he was inspired by several horror films for the episode "The Shut-In" due to being a horror fan. He is also a fan of the Disney series Gargoyles and the film The Princess and the Frog; cast members from both productions have appeared through Amphibia. Both Braly and his wife are fans of RuPaul's Drag Race; RuPaul himself had a recurring role in season 3 of Amphibia.

Filmography

Films

Television

Nominations and awards

Notes

References

External links

Place of birth missing (living people)
Living people
American people of Thai descent
American male voice actors
Television producers from California
American television writers
Animators from California
California Institute of the Arts alumni
American male television writers
Disney Television Animation people
Cartoon Network Studios people
Showrunners
Screenwriters from California
American storyboard artists
1988 births